Virden Township (N½ T12N R6W) is located in Macoupin County, Illinois, United States. As of the 2010 census, its population was 3,671 and it contained 1,711 housing units.

Geography

Demographics

Adjacent townships
 Auburn Township, Sangamon County (north)
 Divernon Township, Sangamon County (northeast)
 Bois D'Arc Township, Montgomery County (east)
 Girard Township (south)
 North Otter Township (west)
 Talkington Township, Sangamon County (northwest)

References

External links
US Census
City-data.com
Illinois State Archives

Townships in Macoupin County, Illinois
Townships in Illinois